Bekas is a 2012 Kurdish comedy-drama film written and directed by Karzan Kader. The film stars Zamand Taha and Sarwar Fazil.

Plot
Set in the 1990s of Iraqi Kurdistan, the story follows two shoeshiner brothers named Dana (Zamand) and Zana (Sarwar) who set off to America in order to meet Superman.

Screenings
Bekas had its inaugural screening at the Dubai Film Festival in 2012. It was later screened at the 6th Bangalore International Film Festival in Bengaluru on December 26, 2013.

Awards and nominations

Bekas won a People's Choice Award and was nominated for the Muhr Arab Award  at the 2012 Dubai Film Festival.

References

External links

Kurdish-language films
2010s coming-of-age comedy films
2010s road comedy-drama films
Features based on short films
Films about brothers
Films about children
Films about homelessness
Films about orphans
Films set in the 1990s
Films set in Iraq
Films set in Kurdistan
Films set in deserts
Iraqi drama films
Iraq War films
Swedish comedy-drama films
Finnish comedy-drama films
2012 comedy films
2012 films
2012 drama films
2010s Swedish films